Justice is a census-designated place (CDP) in Rogers County, Oklahoma, United States. The population was 1,311 at the 2000 census.

Geography
According to the U.S. Geological Survey, Justice is located at  (36.2909, -95.5636).

Demographics
As of the census of 2000, there were 1,311 people, 460 households, and 386 families residing in the CDP. The population density was 146.4 people per square mile (56.5/km2). There were 480 housing units at an average density of 53.6/sq mi (20.7/km2). The racial makeup of the CDP was 81.39% White, 0.38% African American, 12.05% Native American, 0.15% Asian, 0.08% from other races, and 5.95% from two or more races. Hispanic or Latino of any race were 0.69% of the population.

There were 460 households, out of which 37.0% had children under the age of 18 living with them, 75.7% were married couples living together, 6.5% had a female householder with no husband present, and 15.9% were non-families. 13.0% of all households were made up of individuals, and 5.2% had someone living alone who was 65 years of age or older. The average household size was 2.76 and the average family size was 3.00.

In the CDP, the population was spread out, with 25.7% under the age of 18, 5.9% from 18 to 24, 27.1% from 25 to 44, 29.3% from 45 to 64, and 12.1% who were 65 years of age or older. The median age was 40 years. For every 100 females there were 98.3 males. For every 100 females age 18 and over, there were 96.4 males.

The median income for a household in the CDP was $47,500, and the median income for a family was $51,618. Males had a median income of $41,429 versus $25,156 for females. The per capita income for the CDP was $20,909. About 6.2% of families and 8.8% of the population were below the poverty line, including 2.4% of those under age 18 and 5.4% of those age 65 or over.

References

External links
 Justice, Oklahoma is at coordinates . 
 See also another place name Justice see 

Census-designated places in Rogers County, Oklahoma
Census-designated places in Oklahoma